Juozapas Skvireckas (1873–1959) was a Lithuanian archbishop of Kaunas (1926–1959).

In 1911–1937 he translated the Bible into the Lithuanian language; it was published in six volumes by the Society of Saint Casimir. During the occupation of the Baltic States by the Nazis, Skvireckas and his assistant, bishop Vincentas Brizgys, welcomed the Nazis. Skvireckas would provide chaplains for Lithuanian-manned Nazi auxiliary units. In later years however Skvireckas issued multiple protests to Nazi authorities regarding the conditions of the Catholic church in Lithuania. He also sent reports to Vatican and since 1942 started receiving instructions from papal office. In 1944, Skvireckas, Brizgys and over 200 other Lithuanian clergymen left Kaunas with retreating German forces, and went into exile. He would settle in Austria, where he died in 1959. After his death, the post of an (arch)bishop of Kaunas was vacant until 1989.

References

Archbishop Juozapas Skvireckas
THE ARCHDIOCESE OF KAUNAS

Further reading
"Arkivyskupas Juozas Skvireckas" by Arūnas Streikus, "Kauno Arkivyskupijos Naujienos", No. 3, winter of 1999
Church Institution during the Period of Nazi Occupation in Lithuania
Archbishop Skvireckas's diary, 1941 m. Birželio sukilimas (collection documents), ed. V. Brandišauskas, Vilnius, 2000
Vilma Narkutė, The Confrontation Between the Lithuanian Catholic Church and the Soviet Regime, New Blackfriars, Volume 87 Issue 1011, pages 456–475, 2006

1873 births
1959 deaths
People from Pasvalys District Municipality
People from Kovno Governorate
Archbishops of Kaunas
20th-century Roman Catholic archbishops in Lithuania
Lithuanian collaborators with Nazi Germany
Translators of the Bible into Lithuanian